Ferunabad Rural District is in the Central District of Pakdasht County, Tehran province, Iran. At the National Census of 2006, its population was 17,065 in 4,084 households. There were 5,723 inhabitants in 1,510 households at the following census of 2011. At the most recent census of 2016, the population of the rural district was 6,136 in 1,711 households. The largest of its six villages was Qaleh Now-e Amlak, with 3,432 people.

References 

Pakdasht County

Rural Districts of Tehran Province

Populated places in Tehran Province

Populated places in Pakdasht County